La Joya Independent School District is a school district headquartered in La Joya, Texas, United States.

The La Joya Independent School District, located in the western portion of Hidalgo County, Texas consist of more than  stretching west of Mission (small portions of Mission are in LJISD) to Sullivan City, including the smaller communities of La Joya, Palmview, and Peñitas. Boundaries extend from the United States border formed by the Rio Grande to the  line near McCook.

Incorporated places served by LJISD include La Joya, Palmview, Penitas, Sullivan City, and sections of Alton and Mission. La Joya ISD also serves other unincorporated communities including Abram, Citrus City, Cuevitas, Doffing, Havana, La Homa, Los Ebanos, Palmview South, and Perezville, as well as portions of West Sharyland.

In 2009, the school district was rated "academically acceptable" by the Texas Education Agency.

The Texas Education Agency's college readiness performance data shows that only 2.4% (31 out of 1288 students) of the graduates of the class of 2010 of the La Joya school district met TEA's average performance criterion on SAT or ACT college admission tests.

Jimmy Carter Early College High School is a 2018 recipient of the U.S. Department of Education's Blue Ribbon School of Excellence award.

District growth
 With a peak enrollment of 23,444 students for the 2004-2005 academic school year, of which Hispanic students account for over 99 percent of enrollment, La Joya ISD is one of the fastest growing school districts in Texas with an estimated increase of 1,400 students per year. Overall, La Joya ISD boasts over 30 campuses; twenty-three elementary schools, eight middle schools, four Alternative Education Centers, three "Early College" high schools, and three comprehensive high schools. La Joya ISD employs over 4,260 individuals from all across the Rio Grande Valley and some from overseas.

History
 The first schools were established during the 19th century to provide educational opportunities for the people living in western Hidalgo County who did not have access to existing educational institutions. One of the first of these schoolhouses was built in Havana in 1849 when citizens from the towns and villages of Abram-Perezville (Ojo de Agua), Penitas, Tabasco (now La Joya), Havana, Los Ebanos and Cuevitas established a place of learning. Although far from the little red schoolhouse one might envision, the structure of rock and adobe sheltered the students of this area and gave them a solid education. This building would later become known as the La Joya Independent School District.

In 1993 the district was majority Hispanic, and as of that year, annually 1,000 new students enrolled in the district. Over 3,000 students were enrolled at La Joya High School. In 1992, one elementary had a growth rate of 17% and another had a growth rate of 18%. James E. Garcia of the Austin American-Statesman stated that, according to experts, birthrates in La Joya ISD were among the highest in the United States and "rival those of some undeveloped countries like Bangladesh". Garcia said that many of the new students are born in the district or more there with their parents, while some are Mexican immigrants who are legally and illegally in the United States.

In December 1993, there was a proposal for a new policy stating that all students were required to live with their parents or legal guardians so that the increasing enrollment trends would be reduced. Garcia stated that the school board was "expected" to approve the measure on Tuesday December 14, 1993, and that few of the district residents expressed opposition. Garcia wrote "While hundreds of students could be denied admission under the policy change, the proposal appears to be drawing more interest from educators and others statewide than within the school district's boundaries." Officials from the Texas Education Agency (TEA) believed that the district was violating state law by doing this. Groups favoring more rights for immigrants argued that the district was trying to prevent Mexican migrants from enrolling. Garcia stated that other school districts along the Texas-Mexico border were trying to determine if such a policy was workable.

 it had about 30,000 students.

Facilities
In 2018 it was building a school district-owned water park with financing from the district's general fund, making it the first water park in the state owned by a school district. The  water park is open to the public for six days of the week. In addition LJISD built a  natatorium, a 27-hole golf course, and four tennis courts; the district previously used City of La Joya swimming pool facilities. These developments are in the LJISD Sports and Learning Complex, in unincorporated Hidalgo County. It includes the 12,600-capacity La Joya ISD Stadium.

Schools

High schools (grades 9–12)

Middle schools (grades 6-8)

Elementary schools (grades PK-5)

UIL district alignment

2014–2016 District 30-6A
The new UIL realignment changed the classifications of high schools in the State of Texas. High schools, based on enrollment numbers, are divided into classifications and districts, with 6A schools being the larger schools (enrollment of 2100+). La Joya ISD will have all three comprehensive high schools in the new 6A classification, and will once again join the three McAllen ISD schools, along with long-time rival Mission CISD's Mission High School.

La Joya ISD
La Joya High School Coyotes
Palmview High School Lobos
Juarez-Lincoln High School Huskies
McAllen ISD
McAllen High School Bulldogs
McAllen Memorial High School Mustangs
James "Nikki" Rowe High School Warriors
Mission CISD
Mission High School Eagles

References

External links

 
 Google Maps - Satellite view of La Joya's High Schools, Football Stadium, Transportation Dept. and Central Office.

School districts in Hidalgo County, Texas